Richard Rapier Stokes,  (27 January 1897 – 3 August 1957) was a British soldier and Labour politician who served briefly as Lord Privy Seal in 1951.

The second son of Philip Folliott Stokes and his wife Mary Fenwick Rapier, the only surviving child of Richard Christopher Rapier (1836–1897) of Ransomes & Rapier, Richard Stokes was educated at Downside School, Sandhurst and after the war Trinity College, Cambridge. He served in the Royal Artillery during World War I, winning the Military Cross and bar and the Croix de Guerre. His uncle Sir Wilfred Stokes, chairman and managing director of the engineering firm Ransomes & Rapier invented the Stokes Mortar in World War I. His uncle Leonard Stokes was an architect who designed the new buildings at Downside School (built 1912, when Richard was at Downside). Another uncle was the landscape painter Adrian Scott Stokes. Richard Stokes was chairman (1939) and supporter of the School of Economic Science.

On going down from Cambridge he joined his family's business, Ransomes & Rapier, and was made managing director at the age of 30. When rearmament was proposed by the National Government Stokes offered to charge the nation cost price for all his firm's rearmament work, although it was rejected by the National Government - a rejection he criticised in his maiden speech. Though he held office under Labour governments he was said to have remained a backbencher at heart.

Having unsuccessfully fought Glasgow Central in 1935, Stokes won the Ipswich seat in a 1938 by-election, which he kept in the 1945, 1950, 1951 and 1955 elections. He was known for his independence in parliament.  

Prior to the war, he co-wrote a paper (with Andrew MacLaren and George Lansbury) analysing the economic forces menacing peace in Europe. He founded and led the Parliamentary Peace Aims Group. With Bishop George Bell and fellow Labour Member of Parliament (MP) Alfred Salter, opposing area strategic bombing during World War II. After the RAF's bombing of Dresden on the night of 13 February and the early hours of 14 February 1945, his questions in the House about the act were in part responsible for the reappraisal of the Government's bombing policy in the last month of the war in Europe. Stokes was also a prominent critic of the inadequacy of Allied tank design. He raised other issues after the war relating to Yalta and the forced repatriation of Yugoslavs, and the treatment of Dr George Chatterton-Hill in Germany.

Following the 1945 general election, Labour were returned to power.  Stokes devoted much of his energy to the Friends of Ireland group, of which he was treasurer. He was appointed Lord Privy Seal and the new position of Minister of Materials in April 1951, succeeding Ernest Bevin but served only a few months before Labour lost the 1951 general election. He aimed to show that the proposed armaments programme could be carried out, contrary to Aneurin Bevan and Harold Wilson (who had resigned over this and other issues). After Labour lost power to the Conservatives he was shadow Defence spokesman for a while.

Stokes died at home on 3 August 1957 in London of a heart attack, according to his death notice. A few days before, on 23 July, he had been in a road accident when his car overturned during a thunderstorm on the flooded London road at Stanway near Colchester.

References

External links 
 
 Profile
 

1897 births
1957 deaths
People educated at Downside School
Graduates of the Royal Military Academy, Woolwich
Stokes Richard
Members of the Parliament of the United Kingdom for Ipswich
Labour Party (UK) MPs for English constituencies
Members of the Privy Council of the United Kingdom
British Secretaries of State
Lords Privy Seal
UK MPs 1935–1945
UK MPs 1945–1950
UK MPs 1950–1951
UK MPs 1951–1955
UK MPs 1955–1959
British Army personnel of World War I
Royal Artillery officers
Honorary Members of the Royal Academy of Music
Recipients of the Military Cross
Ministers in the Attlee governments, 1945–1951
Parliamentary Peace Aims Group